High Society is the second studio album in 2004 by Epik High.

Track listing
신사들의 산책 (Gentleman's Stroll) (Good Morning)
High Skool 
평화의 날 (Day of Peace)
Sunrise Interlude 
Lesson 2 (Sunset) 
My Ghetto (featuring Kim Yeon-woo) 
The Basics (featuring Unknowndjs) 
신사들의 절약정신 (Gentleman's Saving Spirit) (Good Afternoon) 
Lady (High Society) 
피해망상 (Paranoia) Pt. 3 (featuring TBNY)
11월1일 (November 1) (featuring Kim Jae Suk of WANTED)
뚜뚜루 (Tuturu)
혼자라도 (Although I'm Alone) (featuring Clazziquai) 
Daydream (사직서) (Resignation)
Open M.I.C. (featuring Eun Ji Won, TBNY, Tweak and Dynamic Duo) 
뒷담화 (Gossip)
신사들의 몰락 (Gentleman's Demise) (Good Evening)
I Remember (70s Soul Remix) (featuring Asoto Union and Kensie) (Bonus Track)

External links
  Epik High's Official Site
  WOOLLIM Entertainment's Official Site
  CJ Music's Official Site

2004 albums
Epik High albums
Woollim Entertainment albums